Crawford Hill is  located in Holmdel Township, New Jersey, United States. It is Monmouth County's highest point, as well as the highest point in New Jersey's coastal plain, standing at least 380 feet (116 m) above sea level.  The hill is best known as the site of an annex to the Bell Labs Holmdel Complex.

Arno Penzias and Robert Wilson of Bell Labs used the Holmdel Horn Antenna located on Crawford Hill to take measurements of the cosmic microwave background radiation. They were awarded the 1978 Nobel Prize in Physics for these efforts that supported the Big Bang theory. For more information, see Discovery of cosmic microwave background radiation.

More recently the laboratory has undertaken research in the fields of wireless and fiber-optic communication and award-winning Bell Laboratories researchers in these fields, working at Crawford Hill include Herwig Kogelnik and Gerard Foschini.

Herwig Kogelnik won the 2001 Marconi International Fellowship Award and IEEE Medal of Honor for his work in the development of fiber optic technology and the 2006 National Medal of Technology.

Gerard J. Foschini was the 2002 recipient of the Thomas Alva Edison Patent Award for his pioneering inventions having to do with the capacity of communications systems with multiple antennas.

In 2020, Nokia sold the Crawford Hill facility and relocated the remaining Bell Labs research staff to the Murray Hill campus.

References

External links
Herwig Kogelnik IEEE Award Web Site
Gerard J. Foschini on the Bell Labs web site

Landforms of Monmouth County, New Jersey
Holmdel Township, New Jersey
Hills of New Jersey